The Nyima language, known as Lenyima or after the people as Anyima, is an Upper Cross River language of Nigeria.

References

Languages of Nigeria
Upper Cross River languages